This is a list of 86 species in the genus Micromus.

Micromus species

References